Dešná is a municipality and village in Jindřichův Hradec District in the South Bohemian Region of the Czech Republic. It has about 600 inhabitants.

Administrative parts
Villages of Bělčovice, Chvalkovice, Dančovice, Hluboká, Plačovice and Rancířov are administrative parts of Dešná.

References

External links

 

Villages in Jindřichův Hradec District